Simon was a medieval Bishop of Worcester.

Life

Simon was a chaplain and chancellor of Adeliza of Louvain, the second wife of King Henry I of England, before being elected to the see of Worcester about 29 March 1125. He was ordained a priest on 23 May 1125 and consecrated on 24 May 1125, at Canterbury by the archbishop, William de Corbeil. He died about 20 March 1150. Prior to his election, the monks of the cathedral chapter had appealed to William de Corbeil, Archbishop of Canterbury and to William Giffard, Bishop of Winchester, for help in securing a free election, but in the end they accepted Simon's appointment by King Henry I of England. Although he was not a monk, Simon became popular with his monks.

Citations

References

 
 British History Online Bishops of Worcester accessed on 3 November 2007
 

Bishops of Worcester
12th-century English Roman Catholic bishops
1150 deaths
Year of birth unknown